Protein tyrosine phosphatase receptor type C-associated protein is an enzyme that in humans is encoded by the PTPRCAP gene.

The protein encoded by this gene was identified as a transmembrane phosphoprotein specifically associated with tyrosine phosphatase PTPRC/CD45, a key regulator of T- and B-lymphocyte activation. The interaction with PTPRC may be required for the stable expression of this protein.

References

Further reading